Putreda may refer to the following rivers in Romania:

 Putreda, a tributary of the Jijia in Botoșani County
 Putreda, a tributary of the Bistrița in Bistrița-Năsăud County
 Putreda, a tributary of the Râmnicul Sărat in Buzău County